Germania is a painting created at the end of March 1848 during the Revolutions of 1848. This allegorical figure is represented with the Reichsadler, oak leaves (symbols of German strength), an olive branch (as a sign of peace), and a banner.

It was hung in the National Assembly in Frankfurt's Paulskirche, where it concealed the organ. It was meant as a symbol of a united democratic Germany.

After the revolution, the painting belonged to the German Confederation but was not exhibited any more. After the dissolution of the German Confederation, the Bundesliquidationskommission gave the painting and other items of the National Assembly to the Germanisches Nationalmuseum in Nuremberg, in 1867.

The actual painter is unknown. Traditionally the painting is attributed to Philipp Veit since c. 1900. Apparently its allegorical language draws from Veit's Germania painting from 1834–1836. According to Rainer Schoch it might be a collaboration of several artists of the artistic circle Deutsches Haus.

Other symbolism
 Unfettered Shackle While shackles are a symbol of restriction or internment, unfettered shackles are a symbol of freedom, independence, or a new beginning. In national personification, this would indicate past control by another power or nation; either Rome historically, or more specifically, the Holy Roman Empire. (See Germany: History). However, this was most likely a symbol of the defeat of Napoleon Bonaparte after his Conquest of Europe, of which largely sparked the nationalism that led to the German Revolution of 1848.

 Colors Note the prominent black, red and gold flag, which is still in use as the flag of Germany.

 Brandished Sword In this figure, the sword is brandished and held upright, in a gesture of leadership and defense, rather than offense or attack. Nobility, justice and truth are represented.
Broken chains: being free

Breastplate with eagle: strength

Crown of oak leaves: heroism

Olive Branch around the sword: willingness to make peace

Tricolour: flag of liberal-nationalists in 1848

Rays of sun from back: beginning of new era

See also
 Germania (personification)
 National personification

References 

1848 paintings
Collections of the Germanisches Nationalmuseum
Flags in art
German culture
German paintings
National personifications
Paintings in Nuremberg
Romantic paintings